Pavizha Mutthu is a 1980 Indian Malayalam-language film,  directed by Jeassy and produced by Hari Pothan. The film stars Sankaradi, Bahadoor, K. R. Vijaya and M. G. Soman. The film has musical score by G. Devarajan.

Cast
Sankaradi as Malathy's father
Bahadoor as Joseph
Prem Nazir as Dr. Rajan
M. G. Soman as Raveendran
Reena as Geetha
Seema as Malathy
Philomina as Kaliyamma
Pala Thankam as Kalyani
Janardhanan as Thomas
Sukumari as Naaniyamma
P. K. Abraham as Dr Mukundan (Rajans Father)
Pratap K. Pothen as Santhosh
K. R. Vijaya as Sindhu
Vidhubala as Radha

Soundtrack
The music was composed by G. Devarajan with lyrics by Kavalam Narayana Panicker.

References

External links
 

1980 films
1980s Malayalam-language films